Three Creek Lake is a lake in Deschutes County, Oregon. It has an area of 76 acres, a depth of 11–28 feet and an elevation of 6550 feet.
 The picturesque mountain lake is located in a glacial cirque, formed by the Cabot Creek Glaciation 13,000 years ago. Three Creek Lake is overshadowed by Tam McArthur Rim, named after the Oregon Geographic Names Secretary from 1916–1949. Surrounded by old growth forest, fishing and hiking are among the most popular recreational activities.

See also
List of lakes in Oregon

References

Lakes of Oregon
Rivers of Deschutes County, Oregon